Patricia Villanueva Abraján (born 15 February 1955) is a Mexican politician affiliated with the Institutional Revolutionary Party. As of 2014 she served as Deputy of the LIII and LX Legislatures of the Mexican Congress representing Oaxaca.

References

1955 births
Living people
People from Oaxaca
Women members of the Chamber of Deputies (Mexico)
Members of the Chamber of Deputies (Mexico)
Institutional Revolutionary Party politicians
21st-century Mexican politicians
21st-century Mexican women politicians
Deputies of the LX Legislature of Mexico